Destino (English title: Destiny) is a Mexican telenovela produced by Carlos Sotomayor for Televisa in 1990. Was
divided in two parts. Is a remake of 1976 telenovela Mundos opuestos.

Lourdes Munguía and Juan Ferrara starred as protagonists, while Fernando Balzaretti and leading actress Saby Kamalich starred as antagonists in first part of telenovela. Mariagna Prats starred as antagonist in second part.

Plot 
Cecilia is a nice and shy girl. One night after returning from work, Cecilia sees when a man jumps off a building and falls dead at her feet. The body belongs to the son of billionaire Claudio de la Mora. So Claudio meets and befriends her.

Claudio ignores his fake friend René who is behind the drug addiction that drove his son to suicide. René hates Claudio and wants to destroy his entire family including whimsical Mónica, the youngest of the de la Mora family. Cecilia does not have time for such machinations, because one night she is attacked and sexually assaulted by Esteban Camacho, her neighbor that is obsessed with her.

When Cecilia becomes pregnant as a result of the attack, Claudio offers support and his surname for the child she is expecting through marriage. Cecilia is then married to Claudio and enters into an intriguing world beyond her imaginations with many who want her out of the way.

Cast 
 
Lourdes Munguía as Cecilia Jiménez
Juan Ferrara as Claudio de la Mora
Fernando Balzaretti as René Kamini
Mariagna Prats as Cristina Agudelo Palafox 
Saby Kamalich as Ana Rafaela Villaseñor
Marco Muñoz as Luis Jiménez 
Ana Colchero as Mónica de la Mora
Fernando Ciangherotti as Sebastián Labastida
Tomás Goros as José Alberto Alberti 
Beatriz Aguirre as Antonia "Toña"
Tony Carbajal as Dr. Montoya 
Luis Cárdenas as Tte. Antonio Fernández 
Ivette Proal as Beatriz "Beba" Santander 
Pilar Escalante as Rosalinda "Rosy" 
Aurora Molina as Cata 
Martín Barraza as Esteban Camacho 
Lili Blanco as Cecilia "Ceci" Fridman 
Gerardo Vigil as Alejandro 
Miguel Priego as Damián Villena 
Sergio Jurado as Lorenzo 
Jacqueline Munguía as Pamela 
Luis de Icaza as El Gordo 
Adriana Chapela as Magos 
María Teresa Guizar as Lucila 
Claudia Vega as Betty 
Tara Parra as Beatriz 
Erick Sánchez as José Pablo de la Mora Jiménez 
Karen Beatriz as Anita Jiménez de la Mora 
Rafael Sante as Pedro 
Lilian Notni as Paulina
Juan Manuel Vilchis Sosa as Álvaro de la Mora 
 Rafael Santa Desire 
Julio Ahuet as Alatorre 
Malena Castillo as Carmen
Desirée Cantú as Fernanda 
Maya Mishalska as Odette Villatoro
Fernando Camacho

Awards

References

External links

1990 telenovelas
Mexican telenovelas
1990 Mexican television series debuts
1990 Mexican television series endings
Spanish-language telenovelas
Television shows set in Mexico
Televisa telenovelas